
Gmina Kornowac is a rural gmina (administrative district) in Racibórz County, Silesian Voivodeship, in southern Poland.

Villages
Gmina Kornowac contains the villages and settlements of Kobyla, Kornowac, Łańce, Pogrzebień and Rzuchów.

Neighbouring gminas
Gmina Kornowac is bordered by the towns of Pszów and Racibórz, and by the gminas of Lubomia and Lyski.

Twin towns – sister cities

Gmina Kornowac is twinned with:
 Branka u Opavy, Czech Republic
 Vřesina, Czech Republic

References

Kornowac
Racibórz County